Turkish New Zealanders or New Zealand Turks are Turkish people who are New Zealand citizens, residents of New Zealand, or people who are of Turkish descent. Most have come to New Zealand from Turkey and the island of Cyprus.

Turkish people are mostly established their own businesses specialising in traditional Turkish food, such as kebab, baklava, and Turkish delight.
But these businesses don't belong to Turks anymore as most of them were sold to other people.

Demographics

Population
According to the 2013 census, the Turkish ethnic group accounted for 957 residents, which was a 49.5% increase from the 2006 census. This was a greater percentage increase than the 47.6% increase between the 2001 and 2006 censuses.

Areas of settlement
The majority of Turkish New Zealanders live in urban areas, mostly in the North Island (80.6%) and the remainder live in the South Island (19.4%).

The Turkish community mostly live in the  Auckland Region (mostly in the Waitematā Local Board, the Devonport-Takapuna Local Board, and the Orakei Local Board), followed by the Wellington Region, and the Otago Region.

Notable people 
Erkin Bairam, economist at the University of Otago (Turkish Cypriot origin) 
Ayşe Tezel

See also 

Turkish Australians
New Zealand–Turkey relations
Turkish diaspora

References

External links
Pearl of the Islands Foundation, a Turkish cultural foundation in New Zealand
New Zealand Turkish Society
Murat YANBAKAN Turkish Translator in New Zealand

New Zealand
Ethnic groups in New Zealand